Alpine–Casparis Municipal Airport  is a city-owned public-use airport located  northwest of the central business district of Alpine, a city in Brewster County, Texas, United States. It supports two small runways and is not meant for large commercial planes. Alpine-Casparis is the only airport in Brewster County.

Former airline service 

The airport previously had scheduled passenger air service operated by Lone Star Airlines, a commuter air carrier, during the early 1990s flown with Fairchild Swearingen Metroliner propjets. In 1992, Lone Star was flying nonstop to Austin (AUS) with continuing direct service to Dallas/Fort Worth International Airport (DFW).  By 1993, Lone Star was continuing to fly direct one stop service to Dallas/Fort Worth via an intermediate stop in Brownwood, Texas. In 1978, Alpine-based Big Bend Airways was operating flights to Midland/Odessa (MAF) and Lubbock (LBB).

Trans-Texas Airways (TTa) also served Alpine via the Marfa Municipal Airport from the late 1940s to the late 1950s with Douglas DC-3 "Starliners".  By 1964, Solar Airlines was serving the Alpine airport with Beechcraft 18 twin  prop aircraft operating roundtrip flights twice a day on routing of Presidio, TX - Marfa, TX - Alpine - Fort Stockton, TX - Pecos, TX - Monahans, TX - Wink, TX - Dallas Love Field (DAL).

Accident 

Facilities and aircraft 

For the 12-month period ending , the airport had 13,186 aircraft operations, an average of 36 per day: 99% general aviation and 1% military. There are 46 aircraft based at this airport: 85% single-engine, 6% multi-engine and 9% helicopter.

References

External links 
 
 

Airports in Texas
Buildings and structures in Brewster County, Texas
Transportation in Brewster County, Texas